Rhosyr is a community in the far southern corner of Anglesey, Wales. It includes the villages of Dwyran and Newborough, Llangeinwen and Llangaffo.

The community population taken at the 2011 census was 2,226. and includes Llanddwyn Island and Newborough Forest.

Llys Rhosyr
Rhosyr was the site of one of the courts of the 13th-century Welsh prince Llewellyn the Great. Llys Rhosyr (Rhosyr Court) is now an important archaeological site, located close to Newborough. It was rediscovered and partially excavated in 1992, with local activists currently (2017) seeking funding to uncover the remaining two thirds.

Governance
Rhosyr elects a community council of fifteen councillors who, amongst other things, are responsible for maintenance of local footpaths and cemeteries. Until the 2012 Isle of Anglesey electoral boundary changes Rhosyr was also an electoral ward for the Isle of Anglesey County Council. However, since the 2013 local elections it has combined with neighbouring communities, Aberffraw and Bodorgan to form a larger ward, Bro Aberffraw, which elects two county councillors.

References

External links
 Rhosyr Community Council